Amalie Hammild Iuel (born 17 April 1994) is a Danish-Norwegian hurdler. She represented Norway in the women's 400 metres hurdles at the 2015 World Championships in Athletics, but was eliminated in the heats.

Biography
Amalie Iuel was born in Denmark to a Danish mother and a Danish-Norwegian father; the family moved to Norway when she was two years old, and she spent most of her childhood there. The Iuels left Norway when Amalie was twelve due to the demands of her father's job with Telenor; they first moved to Namibia, and later Pakistan, the United Arab Emirates and Thailand. Iuel took up track and field as a young girl in Norway, but did not pursue it seriously before her time in Thailand at the International School Bangkok (ISB); her coach there, Ugo Costessi, introduced her to the 400 metres hurdles. After high school, she moved to the United States and became a student athlete at the University of Southern California (USC).

NCAA
During the 2015 season (her sophomore year at USC) Iuel set both Danish and Norwegian under-23 records in the women's 400 metres hurdles, running 55.92 as a Dane and 56.36 as a Norwegian. She placed seventh at the 2015 NCAA championships with 56.99.

Professional
She received Norwegian citizenship and switched her athletic allegiance from Denmark to Norway in June 2015, shortly before the 2015 European U23 Championships where she placed fifth as a Norwegian in her first international championship meet. She represented Norway in the 400 metres hurdles at the 2015 World Championships in Athletics in Beijing, China, but was eliminated in the first round.

In 2019, she represented Norway at the 2019 Summer Universiade in Naples, Italy and she won the bronze medal in the women's 400 metres hurdles event.

Domestic Championships

References

External links
 
 
 
 
 
 

1994 births
Living people
Sportspeople from Bærum
Sportspeople from Aalborg
Norwegian female hurdlers
World Athletics Championships athletes for Norway
USC Trojans women's track and field athletes
Norwegian people of Danish descent
Danish expatriates in Thailand
World Athletics Championships athletes for Denmark
Norwegian expatriate sportspeople in the United States
Athletes (track and field) at the 2016 Summer Olympics
Olympic athletes of Norway
Norwegian Athletics Championships winners
Universiade medalists in athletics (track and field)
Universiade bronze medalists for Norway
Medalists at the 2019 Summer Universiade
Athletes (track and field) at the 2020 Summer Olympics